Salome '73 is a 1965 Italian comedy film.

Cast
 Aroldo Tieri
 Olimpia Cavalli
 Beverly Garland
 Jane De Clerc

External links
 

1965 films
1960s Italian-language films
Italian comedy films
1965 comedy films
1960s Italian films